Emanuele Tenderini (born 30 June 1977 in Venice) is an Italian comic book artist.

Tenderini is known for his participation in Wondercity, a comic book series produced for France and published in several other nations. During his career he has collaborated with many other comic book series, both for Italy and for other countries.

Biography 
Tenderini attended the Istituto Commerciale Paolo Sarpi and graduated as accountant. Then he worked as graphic designer in a copy bureau in Venice and in a private advertising studio. He moved to Milan where he graduated with honors at the Scuola del Fumetto. Then he came back to Venice where he started his career as colourist, working with the thrash metal band Merendine.

In the same time he worked together Alex Crippa in creating 100 Anime, a comic book published by the French publishing house Delcourt in 2004. In France he earned a positive outcome, as he collaborated since 2005 to other works, Othon & Laiton and Wondercity, and as he published between 2006 and 2007 two volumes of Oeil de Jade as drawer, edited by Les Humanoïdes Associés. In France, he also collaborated to other works like: Prediction (2007-2008), Arcane Majeur, Wisher, La Porte d'Ishtar (2008), Dei and 1066 (2011).

In Italy his main works were the special editions of Dylan Dog in 2007 and of Dampyr in 2008. Other Italian collaborations were Vasco Comics (2007), Rumbler (2008) and The Odissey (2011).

In 2014 he worked with Linda Cavallini creating World of Lumina, a graphic novel developed through their own digital color technic, named Hyperflat, and produced by a crowdfunding on Indiegogo in the same year.

Works 

100 anime - vol 1, 2, 3, Ed. Delcourt - Ed BD, 2004-2007.
Othon & Laiton - vol 1, 2, Ed. Paquet, 2005.
Wondercity - vol 0, 1, 2, 3, 4, 5, 6, Ed. Soleil - Ed Freebooks, 2005.
Oeil de Jade - vol 1, 2, Ed. Les Humanoïdes Associés - Eura, 2006-2007.
Gormiti, Ed. Giochi Preziosi, 2006-2011.
Vasco Comics, - vol 1, 3, 4, Ed. Panini, 2007.
Dylan Dog, nr 250, Ed. Sergio Bonelli, 2007.
Dylan Dog Color Fest, - vol 1, 2, Ed. Sergio Bonelli, 2007-2008.
Prediction, - vol 1, 2, Ed. Delcourt, 2007-2008.
Arcane Majeur, - vol 5, Ed. Delcourt, 2008.
Wisher, - vol 1, Ed. LeLombard, 2008.
Rumbler, Ed. De Agostini, 2008.
Dampyr, nr 100, Ed. Sergio Bonelli, 2008.
The Odissey, Ed. Sperling&Kupfer, 2010.
Dei, Ed. Ankama, 2011.
1066, Ed. Le Lombard - Comma 22, 2011.
World of Lumina, vol 1, Ed. Tatai Lab, 2015.

Awards 
 2009 - Ayaaak Award as outstanding colorist of 2008, for Dylan Dog Color Fest vol 2 and Dampyr n 100.

References

External links
 

Living people
Italian cartoonists
1977 births
Artists from Venice